The 2019 Larry H. Miller Tour of Utah was a seven-stage road cycling stage race that was held from August 12 to August 18 in the American state of Utah. It was the 15th edition of the Tour of Utah and is rated as a 2.HC on the 2019 UCI America Tour.

Schedule

Teams
Two UCI WorldTeams, five UCI Professional Continental teams, and ten UCI Continental teams made up the seventeen teams that participated in the race. Of these teams, four teams (and ) entered only six riders each, while the rest entered seven each. 101 of the 115 riders in the race finished.

UCI WorldTeams

 
 

UCI Professional Continental Teams

 
 
 
 
 

UCI Continental Teams

Stages

Prologue
12 August 2019 – Snowbird Resort, individual time trial (ITT)

Pre-race favorite Daniel Felipe Martínez was forced to pull out of the race at the last moment due to illness, meaning that  would begin the race with only 5 riders.

Stage 1
13 August 2019 – North Logan to North Logan,

Stage 2
14 August 2019 – Brigham City to Powder Mountain Resort,

Stage 3
15 August 2019 – Antelope Island to North Salt Lake,

Stage 4
16 August 2019 – Salt Lake City to Salt Lake City,

Stage 5
17 August 2019 – Canyons Village (Park City Mountain) to Canyons Village (Park City Mountain),

Stage 6
18 August 2019 – Park City to Park City,

Classification leadership

Classification standings

General classification

Points classification

Mountains classification

Young rider classification

Teams classification

Notes

References

External links

2019
2019 UCI America Tour
2019 in American sports
2019 in sports in Utah
August 2019 sports events in the United States